Greenville Gas and Electric Light Company, also known as Duke Power Steam Plant, is a historic power plant located at Greenville, South Carolina. The two brick vernacular Victorian style buildings were built about 1890. The larger building served as a coal-fueled, steam-powered electric generating plant, and is a one-story, rectangular building with round arched window and door openings. The second building is a two-story rectangular building originally used as offices for the power company. They were originally owned and operated by the Greenville Gas and Electric Light and Power Company, then sold in 1910, to a company that later evolved into Duke Power Company.

It was added to the National Register of Historic Places in 1982.

References

Industrial buildings and structures on the National Register of Historic Places in South Carolina
Industrial buildings completed in 1890
National Register of Historic Places in Greenville, South Carolina